They Don't Clap Losers is a 1975 Australian television film directed by John Power and starring Martin Vaughan, Pat Evison, and Michele Fawdon. The plot concerns two single parents who meet through their children.

References

External links
They Don't Clap Losers at Screen Australia

Australian television films
1975 television films
1975 films
1970s English-language films
Films directed by John Power
1970s Australian films